Lichterfeld-Schacksdorf (Lower Sorbian: Swětłe-Šachlejce) is a municipality in the Elbe-Elster district, in Lower Lusatia, Brandenburg, Germany.

History
From 1815 to 1947, the constituent localities of Lichterfeld-Schacksdorf (Lichterfeld, Schacksdorf and Lieskau) were part of the Prussian Province of Brandenburg. From 1952 to 1990, they were part of the Bezirk Cottbus of East Germany. On 31 December 1997, the municipality of Lichterfeld-Schacksdorf was formed by merging the municipalities of Lichterfeld and Schacksdorf. On 31 December 1998, the municipality of Lieskau was merged into it.

Demography

References

Localities in Elbe-Elster